The McCrone report is a document on the Scottish economy written and researched in 1974 on behalf of the British Government. It was composed by Professor Gavin McCrone employed at the Scottish Office using some information that was publicly available at the time and some that was not. The document gave a favourable projection for the economy of an independent Scotland with a "chronic surplus to a quite embarrassing degree and its currency would become the hardest in Europe". It also noted that the Common Market or EEC meant that Scotland could pivot away from the rest of UK (if required) for trade. The memo from UK Civil Servants to UK Government ministers was classified “secret”;some have argued  that this was to avoid fuelling independence sentiment in Scotland. The report became public in 2005 when new freedom of information legislation came into effect.

Report content
The eighteen-page report focused on the likely effects of North Sea oil revenue on the economic viability of an independent Scotland. The report stated:

 "It must be concluded therefore that revenues and large balance of payments gains would indeed accrue to a Scottish Government in the event of independence provided that steps were taken either by carried interest or by taxation to secure the Government 'take'. Undoubtedly this would banish any anxieties the Government might have had about its budgetary position or its balance of payments. The country would tend to be in chronic surplus to a quite embarrassing degree and its currency would become the hardest in Europe with the exception perhaps of the Norwegian kroner. Just as deposed monarchs and African leaders have in the past used the Swiss franc as a haven of security, as now would the Scottish pound be seen as a good hedge against inflation and devaluation and the Scottish banks could expect to find themselves inundated with speculative inflow of foreign funds. "

UK political environment
The document was completed during the latter part of Edward Heath's Conservative government in 1974, just prior to the February 1974 general election. This election produced a 'hung parliament' with Harold Wilson of the Labour Party as Prime Minister. Another general election was called for October 1974, which gave Labour a slim majority in Westminster. The Scottish National Party recorded 30% of the Scottish vote in the October election, their best ever result at that time.

Publication in 2005
The report came to light in 2005 when the SNP obtained several UK Government papers under the Freedom of Information Act 2000. The full provisions of the Act came into force on 1 January 2005.

UK oil production peaked in 1999 and had declined 67% by 2012, but petroleum still contributed £35bn to the UK balance of payments in 2011.  The UK government took an estimated £6,530m in direct petroleum taxes in 2012-13 plus £6bn in income tax, national insurance and corporation tax from supply companies in 2011-12. As of 2012, around 45% of UK oil & gas employees were located in Scotland.  The North Sea oil and gas industry as a whole contributed £35 billion to the UK Treasury in 2014. 

In his evidence to the Lords Committee on the Economic Implications of Scottish Independence in 2012, Professor McCrone stated that Scotland's GDP would increase by around 20% if North Sea oil were counted as part of it.

In an interview for Holyrood Magazine on 19 May 2013, ex-Labour chancellor Denis Healey (who served in the Cabinet at the time the McCrone Report was submitted) stated:  "I think we did underplay the value of the oil to the country because of the threat of [Scottish] nationalism...  I think they [Westminster politicians] are concerned about Scotland taking the oil, I think they are worried stiff about it."

See also
 Government Pension Fund of Norway 
 Sovereign wealth fund
 Commission on Scottish Devolution
 Dutch disease
 Government Expenditure and Revenue Scotland
 Resource curse

References

External links
 The McCrone report - The National, 27 February 2019 
 Original McCrone Report, published 1975
 Searchable re-typed version of the McCrone Report, including Cover Letter 
 How black gold was hijacked: North sea oil and the betrayal of Scotland Independent.co.uk, Friday 9 December 2005
 Hansard, House of Commons, Jan. 2012
North Sea oil gave Scotland 'massive' budget surplus, say Government records
Still raising eyebrows | Holyrood Magazine

Reports of the United Kingdom government
1974 documents
Constitution of the United Kingdom
1974 in Scotland
1974 in British politics
Political history of Scotland
North Sea energy